Jirya (also Romanized as Jīryā, Gīryā(local name)) is a village in Saruq Rural District, Saruq District, Farahan County, Markazi Province, Iran. At the 2006 census, its population was 2,841, in 746 families.

References 

Populated places in Farahan County